This is the results breakdown of the local elections held in the Valencian Community on 8 May 1983. The following tables show detailed results in the autonomous community's most populous municipalities, sorted alphabetically.

Overall

City control
The following table lists party control in the most populous municipalities, including provincial capitals (shown in bold). Gains for a party are displayed with the cell's background shaded in that party's colour.

Municipalities

Alcoy
Population: 66,396

Alicante
Population: 245,963

Benidorm
Population: 24,983

Castellón de la Plana
Population: 124,487

Elche
Population: 164,779

Elda
Population: 53,128

Gandia
Population: 48,558

Orihuela
Population: 50,084

Paterna
Population: 33,237

Sagunto
Population: 55,294

Torrent
Population: 51,762

Torrevieja
Population: 12,321

Valencia

Population: 744,748

See also
1983 Valencian regional election

References

Valencian Community
1983